Edmilson Alves (born February 17, 1976), is a Brazilian midfielder.

Club statistics

References

External links

Profile at Oita Trinita 

1976 births
Living people
Brazilian footballers
Brazilian expatriate footballers
Londrina Esporte Clube players
Ceará Sporting Club players
Clube Atlético Juventus players
Fortaleza Esporte Clube players
Expatriate footballers in Japan
Campeonato Brasileiro Série B players
J1 League players
J2 League players
Oita Trinita players
Vissel Kobe players
Roasso Kumamoto players
Ulsan Hyundai FC players
K League 1 players
Expatriate footballers in South Korea
Brazilian expatriate sportspeople in South Korea
Association football midfielders